Ruslan Kolokolov (born 11 March 1966 in Kyiv) is a former Ukrainian–Soviet professional football player.

Career
For a long time he played for FC Dynamo Kyiv reserves before moving to FC Metalist Kharkiv where he spent almost four seasons. Later he went abroad playing in Poland, but returned to Ukraine after a year.

After winning the Soviet Cup with FC Metalist Kharkiv, Kolokolov played couple of games at the 1988–89 UEFA Cup Winners' Cup (FK Borac Banja Luka).

In 1987 he played at least one friendly for the Soviet Union national under-21 football team in a home tie against the Greece national under-21 football team in Moscow.

Honours
 Soviet Cup winner: 1987–88.
 Spartakiad of the Peoples of the USSR winner: 1986.

References

External links
 

1966 births
Living people
Footballers from Kyiv
Soviet footballers
Ukrainian expatriate footballers
Ukrainian footballers
Expatriate footballers in Poland
FC Metalist Kharkiv players
FC Temp Shepetivka players
FC Zirka Kropyvnytskyi players
FC Metalurh Zaporizhzhia players
FC Kryvbas Kryvyi Rih players
FC Metalist-2 Kharkiv players
Ukrainian Premier League players
Ukrainian First League players
Association football defenders